Roglić is a Serbo-Croatian surname. It may refer to:

Iva Roglić (born 1988), Serbian female basketballer
Primož Roglič (born 1989), Slovenian professional racing cyclist
Zoran Roglić (born 1976), Croatian footballer

Serbian surnames
Croatian surnames